Disability is poorly documented in the Middle Ages, though disabled people constituted a large part of Medieval society as part of the peasantry, clergy, and nobility. Very little was written or recorded about a general disabled community at the time, but their existence has been preserved through religious texts and some medical journals.

Disability in culture 
The disabled community were a definite part of Medieval society. Disability was not considered an extraordinary quality among the medieval people and therefore was not heavily documented. Disability as a category of impairment was not seen in Medieval language, but rather terms such as "blynde", "dumbe", and "lame" were seen to attribute those with physical impairments. The idea of disability being undesirable or unholy stemmed from the later eugenics movement that began in the early 20th century. Many scholars, such as Henri-Jacques Stiker, author of A History of Disability, would argue that people living with disabilities "were no less undistinguished at the dawn of the Middle Ages from the economically weak."

Due to the intensive labor that constituted agriculture during this time period, many peasants and serfs have been found with extensive spinal and limb injuries, as well as stunted growth, malnutrition and general deformity.

Disabled people were found among all parts of society. Monarchs across Europe were noted as having those with short stature, hunchbacks, or others with disabilities in their courts where they filled roles such as that of the King's Fool or court jester. This rank gave the disabled person a level of prestige. They were allowed to mock or tell the truth to the ruler, even if it displeased them to hear it.

Disability in religion 

Christianity, the dominant religion in western Europe, held mixed views on disability. Within the Bible, disability was aligned with sin and punishment, but also with healing and martyrdom.

Some Medieval priests and scholars believed that a body would be corrupted by sin and therefore divine punishment took the form of physical illnesses. However, opposing schools of thought revolved around the concept that those with disabilities showed a higher form of piety than those who did not have physical impairments.

The Bible 

In the Old Testament, God gave people disabilities as a form of divine punishment, with the root of it being a payment for the sins they have committed.

In the New Testament, there is much more content concerning healing and the miracles performed by Jesus Christ.

Canon Law 
Canon Law, the legal codes that the Catholic Church followed, contained few restrictions against those with disabilities, such as the barring of physically disabled from becoming holy men. However, there were contradictory laws within the codes, allowing for those who were disabled after reaching priesthood to be able to move up the hierarchy and become bishops.

The Fourth Lateran Council of 1215 enacted a law that linked bodily infirmity to sometimes be caused by sin. Therefore, Medieval physicians were asked to hear their patients confessions so that their soul would be "cured" before the body was assessed.

Charity 
Among the monasteries and churches of Medieval Europe, charity was often given to those seen as disadvantaged or impaired. The disabled community were among the largest of groups to have benefited from the charity of local monks and priests.

France's Louis IX (Saint Louis) granted blind people a rare legal right to beg on the streets of Paris.

Disability in medieval medicine 

Within the medical world of the Middle Ages, illness and disability were causally linked to sin. Since religion played a large role within Medieval society, many of the changes and deformities to the human body were attributed to one's sins, dating back to Original Sin. There were mixed reactions and perspectives of people with disabilities, because different groups of Christians viewed disabilities in different ways.

Generally, Medieval physicians attributed much of their work to a combination of the ability to treat illness, such as fever and blisters, and religious faith. If an illness or physical impairment did not subside over time, it was considered an "incurable illness" and therefore was deemed as an act of God.

Mental disorders were often classified under demonic possession, as they were not within the physician's ability to diagnose or treat at the time and therefore patients with mental disorders were left to pray for divine healing.

Within the High Middle Ages, an almshouse in the City of London began caring for people with mental disabilities, and Bethlem hospital became the first mental institution in Europe.

Leprosy 
Lepers offered one of the most familiar images of disability in the medieval period. A disease that affected many throughout medieval Europe, leprosy was caused by a combination of poor hygiene and lack of resources such as proper treatments for the disease. At the time, there were mixed feelings about this group. Some, such as Francis of Assisi, argued that lepers were those who transformed themselves into the images of Jesus Christ and were to be treated as living symbol for his martyrdom. Others, especially after the Bubonic Plague began to ravage Europe towards the Late Medieval period, condemned the lepers as sinful and having been the very people to spread the plague. To stop the spread of the horrifying disease, officials put individuals displaying symptoms and sometimes family members into leper houses. They were often in secluded locations and fashioned after monasteries.

Glass delusion 
A few notable cases of glass delusion occurred during the Late Middle Ages. This mental disorder involved a person believing that they were made of glass and that they were fragile, able to break or shatter upon impact.

Melancholia 
Melancholia was believed to be caused by an imbalance of the Four humours within the human body, where an excess of black bile caused depression-like symptoms of sadness and sluggish, lethargic behavior.

Notable disabled people of medieval Europe 

Though disability was present throughout the Middle Ages, very few cases were documented during the Early and High Medieval periods, as few physicians could properly diagnose many conditions.
 King Charles VI of France (1368–1422; ruled 1380–1422), known as Charles le Fou (Charles the Mad), known to have experienced the Glass delusion during his rule.
 King Henry VI of England (1421–1471; ruled 1422–1461 and 1470–1471)
 Nicasius Voerda, born blind and attended Louvain University in 1459, qualifying in arts and theology, later enrolling in University of Cologne in 1489 and earning a doctorate of canon law.
 Aelred of Rievaulx (1110–1167), English writer, abbot, and saint, suffered from self-inflicted malnutrition (fasting), as well as severe arthritis.

See also 
 History of medicine
 Disability in ancient Rome

References 

History of disability
Medieval society